Christopher Lawrence Lindberg (born April 16, 1967) is a Canadian former professional ice hockey player.

Lindberg was a member of the Canadian 1992 Winter Olympics ice hockey team, winning a silver medal.  He would also play professionally in the National Hockey League with the Calgary Flames and the Quebec Nordiques.  He was claimed by the Ottawa Senators in the 1992 NHL Expansion Draft from Calgary, however just two days later, Lindberg was traded back to the Flames for Mark Osiecki.  In total, Lindberg played 116 regular season games in the NHL, scoring 17 goals and 25 assists for 42 points, collecting 47 penalty minutes.

Lindberg was born in Fort Frances, Ontario.

Career statistics

Regular season and playoffs

International

External links 

1967 births
Living people
Binghamton Whalers players
Calgary Flames players
Canadian ice hockey left wingers
Cornwall Aces players
EC VSV players
EHC Olten players
Estevan Bruins players
EV Zug players
GCK Lions players
Genève-Servette HC players
Grand Rapids Griffins (IHL) players
HC Ajoie players
HC Lugano players
Ice hockey people from Ontario
Ice hockey players at the 1992 Winter Olympics
Krefeld Pinguine players
Medalists at the 1992 Winter Olympics
Minnesota Duluth Bulldogs men's ice hockey players
Nippon Paper Cranes players
Olympic ice hockey players of Canada
Olympic medalists in ice hockey
Olympic silver medalists for Canada
Quebec Nordiques players
SC Rapperswil-Jona Lakers players
Springfield Indians players
Undrafted National Hockey League players
Virginia Lancers players
ZSC Lions players
Sportspeople from Fort Frances
Canadian expatriate ice hockey players in Austria
Canadian expatriate ice hockey players in Germany
Canadian expatriate ice hockey players in Switzerland